Kemp is a surname of English origin which means "soldier". Notable people with the surname include:

 Agnes Kemp (1823–1908), American physician and temperance movement leader
 Albert Edward Kemp (1858–1929), Canadian businessman and politician
 Amelia Kemp, English footballer
 Anthony Kemp (actor) (born 1954), British actor
 Anthony Kemp (historian) (1939–2018), English military historian
 Anthony Fenn Kemp (1773–1868), Australian soldier and merchant
 Arthur Kemp (born 1962), South African/British politician and writer
 Barbara Kemp (1881–1959), German opera singer
 Barry Kemp (Egyptologist) (born 1940), English archaeologist and Egyptologist
 Bolivar E. Kemp (1871–1933), Louisiana congressman
 Bolivar Edwards Kemp Jr. (1904–1965), Louisiana Attorney General, 1948–1952
 Brandis Kemp (1944–2020), American actress
 Brian Kemp (born 1963), governor of Georgia (US)
 Carlo Kemp (born 1998), American football player
 Dave Kemp (born 1953), English footballer and football manager
 David Kemp (disambiguation), several people
 Davie Kemp (born 1950), Scottish footballer
 Earl Kemp (1929–2020), American science fiction editor and critic
 Edward Kemp (landscape architect) (1817–1891), English garden designer and author
 Edward Kemp (playwright) (born 1965), English playwright and theatre director, director of RADA
 Elise Kemp (1881–1917), New Zealand born nurse and nursing sister
 Eric Kemp (1915–2009), Bishop of Chichester
 Gary Kemp (born 1959), English pop musician
 Gene Kemp (1926–2015), British author
 George Kemp, 1st Baron Rochdale (1866–1945), British politician, soldier and businessman
 George Meikle Kemp (1795–1844), Scottish carpenter /joiner, draughtsman and architect
 Gilbert Kemp, English footballer
 Hal Kemp (1904–1940), American jazz alto saxophonist, clarinetist, bandleader, composer, and arranger
 Harry Kemp (1883–1960), American poet and prose writer
 Haydn Kemp (1897–1982), English footballer
 C. Henry Kempe (1922–1984), American pediatrician who identified battered child syndrome
 Jack Kemp (1935–2009), American politician and football quarterback
 James Kemp (missionary) (1797–1872), British missionary to New Zealand
 James Furman Kemp (1859–1926), American geologist
 Jan Kemp (1949–2008), American academic who exposed the bias in passing college football players
 Jan Kemp (general) (1872–1946), South African Boer leader, rebel general and politician
 Jeka Kemp (1876–1966), Scottish artist
 Jennifer Kemp (born 1955), American swimmer
 Jeremy Kemp (1935–2019), English actor
 John Kemp (disambiguation), several people
 Johnny Kemp (1959–2015), Bahamian singer, songwriter, and record producer
 Jonathan Kemp (born 1981), English squash player
 Joseph Kemp (minister) (1872–1933), English-born New Zealand Baptist minister and preacher
 Joseph Kemp (organist), English composer and organist
 Sir Joseph Horsford Kemp, Chief Justice of Hong Kong
 Sir Kenneth Hagar Kemp, 12th Baronet (1853–1936), British soldier, lawyer, landowner and cricketer
 Kirsten Kemp (born 1970), English actress and television presenter
 Lindsay Kemp (1938–2018), British dancer, actor, teacher, mime artist and choreographer
 Maida Springer Kemp (1910–2005), American labor organizer 
 Martin Kemp (born 1961), English actor and musician
 Martin Kemp (art historian) (born 1942), British art historian and professor
 Matt Kemp (born 1984), American baseball outfielder
 Matthew Kemp (soccer) (born 1980), Australian footballer
 Mathew Kemp (died 1682), Virginia colonial politician, Speaker of the Virginia House of Burgesses
 Maurice Kemp (born 1991), American basketball player in the Israeli Basketball Premier League
 Paul Kemp (actor) (1896–1953), German actor
 Penn Kemp (born 1944), Canadian writer
 Peter Kemp (rower) (1853–1951), Australian sculler
 Peter Kemp (swimmer) (born 1878), British swimmer
 Richard Kemp (born 1959), British army officer
Richard Kemp (politician), British politician in Liverpool
 Rick Kemp (born 1941), English musician
 Rod Kemp (born 1944), Australian politician
 Roman Kemp (born 1993), English radio host
 Rose Kemp (born 1984), English singer and guitarist
 Ross Kemp (born 1964), English actor and journalist
 Shawn Kemp (born 1969), American basketball player
 Stacey Kemp (born 1988), English pair skater
 Steve Kemp (born 1954), American baseball player
 Steve Kemp (musician) (born 1978), English rock drummer
 Tara Kemp (born 1964), American singer
 Thomas Read Kemp (1783–1844), English property developer and politician
 Tony Kemp (baseball) (born 1991), American baseball player
 Tony Kemp (nurse), English nurse
 Tony Kemp (rugby league) (born 1968), New Zealand rugby league footballer and coach
 Troy Kemp (born 1966), Bahamas high jumper
 Ursula Kemp (c.1525–1582), English cunning woman and midwife
 Willie Kemp (1888–1965), Scottish singer and writer
 Willy Kemp (born 1925), Luxembourgian professional road bicycle racer

See also
Te Keepa Te Rangihiwinui, a Māori soldier whose name was often anglicised to "Major Kemp"
Kemp (disambiguation)
Kempe (disambiguation)

References

English-language surnames
Surnames of Scottish origin